At the 1997 West Asian Games. the athletics events were held in Tehran, Iran in November 1997. It had a men's only programme containing twenty-two track and field events. All performances were affected by the altitude of the host city (3900 ft/1189 m).

The host nation dominated the proceedings, winning half of the gold medals on offer (11) and more than half of the total medals with its haul of 38 medals. Kuwait was a comfortable second with eight golds among its fifteen medals, while Jordan was a distant third with one gold in its total of five medals. Seven nations reached the medal table in the athletics competition.

The competition was of a relatively low standard for an international athletics meet. Virtually all the performances were closer to the level expected in elite women's competitions. Among the better performers were Maksim Smetanin, a 1996 Olympian from Kyrgyzstan who won the triple jump with 15.90 metres. Two young athletes in the throws discus thrower Abbas Samimi (aged 20), sprinter Fawzi Al-Shammari (aged 18) and hammer thrower Dilshod Nazarov (aged 15) secured their first major medals at an international meeting – all went on to claim multiple medals at the Asian Games and Asian Athletics Championships later in their careers.

Medalists

Medal table

References

West Asian Games. GBR Athletics. Retrieved on 2013-10-06.

External links
Official website

West Asian Games
1997 West Asian Games
1997
1997 West Asian Games